This is a partial list of pinball games organized alphabetically by name.

List
There are currently  games on this list.

See also
 List of pinball manufacturers
 Glossary of pinball terms
 List of arcade video games

Notes

References

External links
 Internet Pinball Database – Searchable database of pinball machines
 

List
Pinball games